Barry Bradfield (born April 1, 1981) is a Canadian artist.  From June 1994 to July 1997 his untitled comic strip was published in the Ottawa Citizen.  The comic, usually one-panel in length, ranged in topics from political humour to slices of life.

In 1998, Bradfield created Batman:  The Animated Homepage which featured information and images from Batman: The Animated Series.  Following a merger with Superman: The Animated Message Board created by James Harvey, the site became The World's Finest.  Bradfield has since left the site to pursue other interests.

Bradfield has been creating original material and characters since 1994 including his superhero genre parody "Sinus-Man".  He also collaborated with Mike Jakubinek on their spy genre parody, "James Bean: Double-Oh-Nothing" which was featured in an animated short in 2002.

Barry Bradfield holds a diploma in Animation Television from Algonquin College.  He currently works as a freelance toy designer for Art Asylum and Diamond Select Toys, and is illustrating an upcoming children's book to be published by Bunkhouse Press.

External links 
Basement24.com - The Art of Barry Bradfield

References 

1981 births
Living people
Algonquin College alumni
Artists from Ottawa
Canadian cartoonists